Sankshi Fort  सांक्शी किल्ला  This fort is located in Pen Taluka of Raigad district of Maharashtra.

History
A Sank king built the fort. He had a daughter named Jagamata. The king was killed in battle, his daughter committed suicide by jumping from the fort; this is the popular myth.
In 1540 Nizamshah of Ahmednagar captured this fort from Gujarath's sultan. The Sultan of Gujarat captured it back with the help of Portuguese. Later he assumed the Nizam were counter-attacking the fort, so he handed over the fort to the Portuguese and ran away to Gujarat. Due to frequent attacks on the army by the Nizam, the Portuguese purchased the fort along with Karnala fort from Nizam.

Places of interest
There are no Bastions or Gate on the fort. But there are plenty of rock cut cisterns on the fort and a small cave. Climbing the fort is through rugged, rough rocky boulders.  The Badruddin Darga at the base of the fort is worth visiting. There is a water cistern called Gajishah tank on the way to the top. From the top of this fort many forts like Karnala, Manikgad and Sagargad are seen.

How to reach
The road from Tarankhop village on Mumbai-Goa National highway rightly takes to the Sankshi fort. The road from village Balawali is a tiresome walk of 1 hour Sankshi is a very small fort to climb, but hiring a guide from the nearby village is recommended. There are no proper steps or gate on the fort. There are two ways to climb the fort. The northern and the eastern way. It takes about 20 minutes to see the fort.

See also 

 List of forts in Maharashtra
 List of forts in India

 Marathi People
 List of Maratha dynasties and states
 Maratha War of Independence
 Battles involving the Maratha Empire
 Maratha Army
 Maratha titles
 Military history of India
 List of people involved in the Maratha Empire

References 

Raigad district
Buildings and structures of the Maratha Empire
Forts in Pune district
16th-century forts in India
Tourist attractions in Raigad district
Hiking trails in India

Hiking